Peppe is a given name, nickname (often a short form of Giuseppe) and surname which may refer to:

People
 Giuseppe Cataldo (1938−2011), Italian mobster
 Giuseppe Durato (born 1992), Italian manga artist
 Peppe Eng (born 1948), Swedish sports journalist and television presenter
 Peppe Lanzetta (born 1956), Italian actor
 Peppe Femling (born 1992), Swedish biathlete
 Giuseppe Piromalli (born 1921) (1921–2005), Italian crime boss
 Giuseppe Poeta (born 1985), Italian basketball player
 Audrey Peppe (1917–1992), American figure skater
 Carlos Peppe (born 1983), Uruguayan footballer
 Rodney Peppé (born 1934), British author and illustrator

Fictional characters
 Peppe, in the 1860 opera Rita

See also
 Peppes Pizza, a Norwegian pizza chain
 Pepe (disambiguation)

Hypocorisms